In mathematics, particularly in the fields of nonlinear dynamics and the calculus of variations, the Chaplygin problem is an isoperimetric problem with a differential constraint.  Specifically, the problem is to determine what flight path an airplane in a constant wind field should take in order to encircle the maximum possible area in a given amount of time.  The airplane is assumed to be constrained to move in a plane, moving at a constant airspeed v, for time T, and the wind is assumed to move in a constant direction with speed w.

The solution of the problem is that the airplane should travel in an ellipse whose major axis is perpendicular to w, with eccentricity w/v.

References
 
 
 

Calculus of variations